This is a list of present and past royal warrant of appointment holders of the British Royal Family.

British royal warrants are currently granted by King Charles III to companies or tradespeople who supply goods and services. The warrant enables the supplier to advertise the fact that they supply to the royal family. The professions, employment agencies, party planners, the media, government departments, and "places of refreshment or entertainment" (such as pubs and theatres) do not qualify. The Merchandise Marks Act 1887 makes it illegal for companies to falsely claim that they have a royal warrant.

Grantors

 Elizabeth II granted 686 royal warrants during her reign. Warrants that had not previously expired were subject to review upon her death in September 2022. Warrant holders have two years to discontinue the use of her Royal Arms.
 During his tenure as Prince of Wales, Charles III granted 159 royal warrants.
 Prince Philip, Duke of Edinburgh granted 38 royal warrants. As in the case of his wife Elizabeth II, these became subject to review upon his death in April 2021, with holders having two years to discontinue the use of his royal arms.

The Royal Warrant Holders Association has a searchable directory.

Partial table of current warrants

 Date of first Royal Warrant if multiple warrants awarded

Partial table of past warrants

 Date of first Royal Warrant if multiple warrants awarded

References

Bibliography
 By Appointment: 150 Years of the Royal Warrant and Its Holders, Tim Heald, Queen Anne Publisher (2 November 1989),

External links
 Royal Warrants
 The Royal Warrant Holders Association

 
Royal Warrant holders of the British Royal Family
Royal Warrant holders of the British Royal Family